Bobi Gheorghiță Verdeș (born 24 November 1980) is a Romanian former footballer who played as a striker and currently a manager. Verdeș made his Liga I debut on 14 November 2001 and played in his career for Pandurii Târgu Jiu, FC U Craiova, Național București, Oțelul Galați, Argeș Pitești and FCM Bacău, among others.

Honours

Player
Pandurii Târgu Jiu
 Divizia C: 1999–2000
Oțelul Galați
 Cupa României runner-up: 2003–04
Unirea Alba Iulia
 Liga II: 2008–09
Chindia Târgoviște
 Liga III: 2010–11
Flacăra Horezu
Liga IV – Vâlcea County: 2017–18
CSM Slatina
Liga IV – Olt County: 2017–18

Coach
CSM Slatina
Liga IV – Olt County: 2017–18

External links
 
 

1980 births
Living people
People from Drobeta-Turnu Severin
Romanian footballers
Association football forwards
Liga I players
Liga II players
Liga III players
FC Drobeta-Turnu Severin players
CS Pandurii Târgu Jiu players
FC U Craiova 1948 players
FC Progresul București players
ASC Oțelul Galați players
FC Argeș Pitești players
CS Mioveni players
FCM Bacău players
CS Inter Gaz București players
CSM Unirea Alba Iulia players
AFC Chindia Târgoviște players
FC Gloria Buzău players
ASA 2013 Târgu Mureș players
CS Afumați players
CSM Slatina footballers
Romanian football managers
CSM Slatina (football) managers